Kasprzyk is a Polish surname, it may refer to:
 Ewa Kasprzyk (born 1957), Polish actress
 Ewa Kasprzyk (born 1957), Polish athlete
 Marian Kasprzyk (born 1939), Polish boxer
 Stephen Kasprzyk (born 1982), American rower

Polish-language surnames